Convent Mesa, or The Convent, or simply Convent, are alternative names for a 5,955-foot elevation sandstone summit in Grand County of Utah, United States. The Convent is located in Professor Valley, near the city of Moab. It is situated northeast of Parriott Mesa and southwest of the Fisher Towers area. The Convent is a 1,000 feet wide, and 3,000 feet long northwest-to-southeast trending butte with 400-ft vertical Wingate Sandstone walls. The nearest higher peak is Sister Superior (6,037 ft),  to the southeast. Further southeast along the connecting ridge are The Rectory and Castleton Tower. Precipitation runoff from The Convent drains into the nearby Colorado River. The first ascent of Convent was made in November 1965 by Harvey Carter and Steve Miller via the Salvation Chimney climbing route.

Climbing Routes
Climbing Routes on The Convent

 Whore House -  - 5 pitches
 The Value of Audacity -  - 5 pitches
 West Face Dihedral -  - 6 pitches
 Choir Boyz -  - 5 pitches
 Buddha's Delight -  - 6 pitches
 The Middle Way -  - 3 pitches
 Salvation Chimney -

Climate

Spring and fall are the most favorable seasons to visit, when highs average 60 to 80 °F and lows average 30 to 50 F. Summer temperatures often exceed 100 °F. Winters are cold, with highs averaging 30 to 50 °F, and lows averaging 0 to 20 °F. As part of a high desert region, it can experience wide daily temperature fluctuations. The area receives an average of less than 10 inches (25 cm) of rain annually.

See also
 Castle Valley, Utah

Gallery

References

External links
 Photos of first ascent: believesteve.org

Rock formations of Utah
Sandstone formations of the United States
Landforms of Grand County, Utah
Climbing areas of Utah